Dunja is a Serbo-Croatian feminine given name which is in fact homonymous with the vocabulary word for "quince."  It derives from the Greek name of Eudoxia, that means "good fame or judgement". It is a popular name in Serbia, Croatia, and Bosnia. Notable people with the name include:

 Dunja Hayali (born 1974), German journalist and television presenter
 Dunja Ilić (born 1990), Serbian pop singer, songwriter and composer
 Dunja Knebl (born 1946), Croatian acoustic/folk singer
 Dunja Kreiser (born 1971), German politician
 Dunja Mijatović, Bosnian expert on media law and media regulation
 Dunja Vejzović (born 1943), Croatian opera singer

Notes

Feminine given names
Slavic feminine given names
Croatian feminine given names
Serbian feminine given names